Cecil Willmington Spiller (19 August 1900 – 5 April 1974) was a Welsh cricketer.  Spiller was a right-handed batsman who bowled right-arm medium pace.

Spiller represented Glamorgan in 2 first-class matches in 1920, against Sussex and the Hampshire.

Spiller died at Cardiff, Glamorgan on 5 April 1974.

References

External links
Cecil Spiller at Cricinfo
Cecil Spiller at CricketArchive

1900 births
1974 deaths
Cricketers from Cardiff
Welsh cricketers
Glamorgan cricketers